Rodrigo Núñez de Guzmán (12th-century) was a Spanish nobleman, Lord of the Castle of Guzmán.

Biography 

His wife was Goda González de Lara, descendant of Gonzalo Núñez de Lara, (Lord of Lara).

References

External links 
www.royalrurikovich.com

12th-century nobility from León and Castile
Spanish Roman Catholics